Below are the full rosters, including the coaching staffs, of all 30 Major League Baseball teams. All teams are allowed up to 40 players on their roster, which doesn't include players on the 60-day injured list.

American League

American League East

American League Central

American League West

National League

National League East

National League Central

National League West

See also

List of current KBO League team rosters
List of current Nippon Professional Baseball team rosters

Major League Baseball team rosters